Madagascar made its Paralympic Games début at the 2000 Summer Paralympics in Sydney. Its sole representative, Aina Onja, was a blind sprinter who ran the men's 100m sprint in the T11 category. His time of 13.98 was the slowest in the heats, and he did not advance to the semi-finals.

The country was absent from the 2004 Games, but returned to the Paralympics in 2008, represented by a single male swimmer. Josefa Harijaona Randrianony swam in the 50m freestyle (S9 category), and finished last of his heat in 38.06s.

Madagascar has never competed at the Winter Paralympics.

Full results for Madagascar at the Paralympics

See also
 Madagascar at the Olympics

References